Bee Fork is an unincorporated community in Reynolds County, in the U.S. state of Missouri.

The community is on Bee Fork. Missouri Route TT  passes approximately one half mile to the west and Centerville is about 6.5 miles to the east.

History
A post office called Bee Fork was established in 1874, the name was changed to Beefork in 1895, and the post office closed in 1914. The community takes its name from nearby Bee Fork.

References

Unincorporated communities in Reynolds County, Missouri
Unincorporated communities in Missouri